Carlo Masci (born 27 November 1958, in Pescara) is an Italian politician.

He graduated at the University of Parma and he started his lawyer career.

He entered in politics in 1994 and he is a member of the centre-right party Forza Italia. He ran for Mayor of Pescara in the 2003 and in the 2009 local elections, but he was elected Mayor of Pescara on 28 May 2019, when he ran at the elections for the third time. Masci took office on 10 June 2019.

See also
2019 Italian local elections
List of mayors of Pescara

References

External links
 
 

1958 births
Living people
Mayors of Pescara
Forza Italia (2013) politicians